Dr. Cecilia Reyes is a fictional character appearing in American comic books published by Marvel Comics. Created by Scott Lobdell and Carlos Pacheco, the character first appeared in X-Men (vol. 2) #65 (June 1997). She belongs to the subspecies of humans called mutants, who are born with superhuman abilities.

Raised in the Bronx, she is Latin American (originating from Puerto Rico) medical doctor specializing in trauma surgery. She has the mutant ability to project a force field around her body. Unlike most X-Men, she has no interest in superheroics, and desires only to live an ordinary life, having been forced into the team by circumstance. Cecilia Reyes was briefly a member of the X-Men and often works to assist them.

Alice Braga portrayed Dr. Cecilia Reyes in the 2020 film The New Mutants.

Publication history

Created by writer Scott Lobdell and artist Carlos Pacheco, she first appeared in X-Men (vol. 2) #65 (June 1997).

Fictional character biography
Cecilia Reyes decided to become a doctor when her father was gunned down in front of her as a child, and she was unable to do anything to help him. The X-Men tried recruiting her when it was discovered that she was a mutant, but Reyes had no interest in being a superhero. She preferred to pursue her trauma surgeon career.

Operation Zero Tolerance 
When she was targeted by Operation: Zero Tolerance, a government-backed anti-mutant task force, she was forced to join forces with the X-Man Iceman and other mutants to escape New York City and track down Bastion, leader of Operation Zero Tolerance.

After meeting with problems with racism and both encouragement from Daredevil and an encounter with the villain Pyro, Reyes reluctantly joined the X-Men. Her first adventure involved saving Cyclops from a nanotech deep inside his body, which threatened to kill him, Reyes, other X-Men and obliterate anything in a three-mile radius. Despite having absolutely no medical supplies, she improvised in her successful attempt. For example, she had Storm use lightning to boil buckets of water. Afterwards, a dazed Cyclops offers her honorary X-Men status. She has several adventures with the team, combating the Ru'tai and the Shadow King. She usually did not bother with a costume, wearing either the yellow and blue training uniform or, on one occasion as a joke by Beast, an old costume of Wasp's. It was while wearing Wasp's old uniform that Reyes became involved in a battle with the X-Men's frequent enemy, the N'Garai, interdimensional demons. Reyes mostly ran away, but was saved (and mocked) by the X-Man rookie Marrow. She was eventually sucked into the N'Garai dimension, to be experimented upon, but her force field saved her from the cutting instruments. She escaped with the rest of the X-Men and the civilians they had saved.

Reyes was tempted by the Shadow King by offers of a new life, but managed to resist the villain's offer. Reyes did not find costumed adventuring suitable for her, and left to set up her own medical practice.

Later, she was caught up in the X-Men's battle with the Neo, a villainous group of mutants who claimed to have evolved beyond the level of other mutants. Reyes was trapped in the Neo's fortress below New York City and used a street drug called Rave to make her mutant powers more destructive, ensuring her survival. The X-Men rescued her, and the telepathic Professor X helped her kick her addiction to Rave during a detox period back at the X-Mansion.

Reyes last appearance with the X-Men was at the time when Beast discovered the cure to the Legacy Virus. She was the one to discover Colossus dead after injecting himself with the cure. Reyes attempted to revive him, but was unsuccessful.

Neverland
Later, she was seen as a prisoner at a mutant concentration camp run by the Weapon X program, called Neverland. There she attempted to use her medical expertise to help out the other prisoners. She was apparently killed off panel when a brainwashed Agent Zero destroyed the camp, and her death was later confirmed in the letter column of New Excalibur #1. Mike Marts contradicted this in an interview on uncannyxmen.net, stating that if Cecilia would be dead they would show it on panel, and therefore Cecilia was not yet considered deceased at that time.

In X-Men: The 198 Files, it has been revealed that Cecilia's older non-mutant brother, Colonel Miguel Reyes, had been assigned to head O*N*E security on the Xavier School grounds, with the purpose of finding out the fate of his sister.

Return
After M-Day and her escape from Neverland, Cecilia volunteers at local homeless shelters as well as working out of her apartment. According to Bobby Soul, she works off the record and under the table. The NYX teenagers bring an injured Tatiana to her for help. During their visit to her apartment she does not reveal to the teens that she used to be an X-Man. After treating Tatiana, she offers them a place to rest while she goes out for a few hours. Unaware Kiden Nixon is following her, she calls up Beast to ask a favor. Later when Cecilia returns with groceries, she finds the teens have left.

Sometime after these events, Cecilia moves to the X-Men's new base of operations; Utopia. When Magneto decides to bring back Shadowcat as a good will gesture, Cyclops asks specifically for her to help treat him of any injuries he might have suffered.

The Five Lights
After the events of Second Coming, Cecilia is partnered with Psylocke and sent to Mexico to locate the second of the Five Lights; the first mutants to manifest powers since M-Day. After sedating Gabriel, she informs his parents of what is transpiring and offers him help from the X-Men. Psylocke comes to the room and explains that something has happened, Gabriel's manifesting speed powers caused him to move so fast he is invisible to the naked eye. Psylocke taps into Cecilia's powers to create a force field around his room so they would not lose him before Hope Summers could arrive to help.

X-23
Gambit and X-23 arrive in New York City following a lead from London. Gambit is injured, with his wounds reopening later on. They visit Cecilia at her apartment, and she agrees to give Gambit stitches, but is perturbed at being disturbed and admits she left Utopia to avoid such "stupidity". X-23 picks up the scents of her friends from NYX in the apartment, and asks where they are. Cecilia states that she gave them permission to stay there before she went to Utopia, but they were gone by the time she returned. X-23 leaves to pursue a lead, and the city is soon rocked by a mysterious earthquake. Cecilia and Gambit help rescue and treat quake victims. Cecilia then accompanies Gambit as he searches for X-23, eventually finding her recovering in the care of the Future Foundation.

Fear Itself
During the "Fear Itself" storyline, Cecilia is added to a team of X-Men opposing the "worthy" empowered Juggernaut in the form of Kuurth: Breaker of Stone. She is instructed by Cyclops to protect a mob of anti-mutant protesters following Kuurth's attack.

Astonishing X-Men
Although she is still more comfortable healing humans than fighting superhumans, Cecilia Reyes is part of the new team composed by Wolverine. Alongside Northstar, Iceman, Beast, Gambit and Warbird, she assists to Northstar's wedding and tries to help Karma, whose mind has been taken over Ms. Hatchi for yet unknown reasons. She is also carrying on a romantic relationship with Gambit.

Dawn of X
In the new status quo for mutants post House of X and Powers of X, Professor X and Magneto invite all mutants to live on Krakoa and welcome even former enemies into their fold. Cecilia Reyes becomes something of a medical expert on mutant biology, running medical operations, autopsies and the like. She is also approached by Prodigy of X-Factor with a suggestion to build a body farm to study the effects of decomposition on mutant bodies.

Powers and abilities
Cecilia can generate a force field described as a "psioplasmic bio-field" around her body. This force field provides superhuman durability, increasing her resistance to energy and physical attacks. She can shape or expand it to protect those nearby. Impacts on the force field cause Cecilia pain. She also has shown the ability to wield her forcefield as a blunt force, pushing others out of her way. She can create spikes which could punch through a human body. Under the effects of the mutant-enhancing drug Rave, Cecilia is able to use her force field offensively, as a blade to attack enemies. The field can be raised consciously and in her initial appearances, shown triggered by any external force used against it.

Additionally, Cecilia is a capable medical doctor and surgeon.

Reception

Critical reception 
Marc Buxton of Den of Geek said, "Dr. Cecilia Reyes has a really cool power, the ability to cast a force field that can protect herself or others, but the true specialness of the character is her desire to be a doctor instead of a superhero. Reyes is the X-Men’s most skilled healer, a woman who seeks true service as a medical professional rather than an adventuring crusader. Reyes is one of the most underutilized but humane of all the X-Men, a woman who has a clear sense of identity and purpose beyond throwing down with Unus, the Untouchable."

Accolades 

 In 2014, Entertainment Weekly ranked Cecilia Reyes 95th in their "Let's rank every X-Man ever" list.
 In 2014, BuzzFeed ranked Cecilia Reyes 49th in their "95 X-Men Members Ranked From Worst To Best" list.
 In 2017, Den of Geek included Cecilia Reyes in their "40 X-Men Characters Who Haven’t Appeared in the Movies But Should" list.
 In 2019, CBR.com ranked Cecilia Reyes ranked 10th in their "Ranking All The Members Of NYX" list.
 In 2020, Scary Mommy included Cecilia Reyes in their "Looking For A Role Model? These 195+ Marvel Female Characters Are Truly Heroic" list.
 In 2020, CBR.com ranked Cecilia Reyes 5th in their "Doctors Unite! The Doctors Of Marvel Comics" list and 10th in their "10 Best Superhero Doctors In Marvel & DC" list.
 In 2022, Newsarama included Cecilia Reyes in their "20 X-Men characters that should make the jump from Marvel comics to the MCU" list.
 In 2022, Screen Rant included Cecilia Reyes in their "10 Best Doctors In Marvel Comics" list.
 In 2022, CBR.com ranked Cecilia Reyes 3rd in their "X-Men Who Deserve Their Own Spinoff Films" list.

Other versions
In the Age of X-Man reality, Dr. Cecilia Reyes is the Medical Instructor of the 10th Year class within the Summers Institute Of Higher Learning, located in Winchester, NY.

In Days of Future Now, Cecilia survived the death camp Neverland and tried to help Wolverine to change the past to prevent "Days of Future Now" from ever happening. While watching over him, she was shot in the back by a Fantomex who was under the control of Sublime.

In X-Men: The End, she also had survived Neverland and has married Beast and they have three children (two boys and one girl), Ciaran, Francesca & Miguel McCoy.

In other media
Dr. Cecilia Reyes appears in The New Mutants, portrayed by Alice Braga. This version works for the Essex Corporation, who tasked her with monitoring potential recruits.

References

External links
 
 
 World of Black Heroes: Cecilia Reyes Biography
 

Comics characters introduced in 1997
Fictional female doctors
Fictional Hispanic and Latino American people
Fictional surgeons
Marvel Comics female superheroes
Marvel Comics mutants
Puerto Rican superheroes
X-Men supporting characters